James Callaghan "Chic" Charnley (born 11 June 1963 in Glasgow) is a Scottish former football player and coach. Charnley's playing career lasted nearly 20 years, with spells at Hamilton Academical, St Mirren, Hibernian and Dundee, however he is perhaps best known for his numerous spells at Partick Thistle. He also was a coach at Thistle for a short time and was briefly assistant manager of Clyde. Throughout his career, Charnley had a reputation as being a hot-head; he was sent off 17 times in a senior career which lasted for nearly 20 years.

Club career
Charnley played for a number of clubs: Ayr United, Clydebank, Hamilton Accies, Partick Thistle, St Mirren, Bolton (on loan), Djurgårdens IF, Dumbarton, Dundee, Hibernian and Cork City F.C.

He also played for non-league clubs Rutherglen Glencairn, Pollok, Tarff Rovers and Kirkintilloch Rob Roy.

Charnley acquired his nickname in his youth when he would sell poultry door-to-door in the Possilpark district of northern Glasgow, where he was brought up as a supporter of Celtic. In 1994, he had a trial for Celtic playing one game for them in a friendly against Manchester Utd at Old Trafford. Many rated him as the best player in the game and it was rumoured that he had done enough to win a contract. However, Celtic's manager Lou Macari was sacked not long after this friendly game and rumours of a move to Celtic came to nothing.

Partick Thistle
It is as a player with Partick Thistle that he will be best remembered. He played for the club on a few different occasions and is considered something of a cult hero at Firhill, as well as a member of their Hall of Fame. He initially left Partick for St Mirren in June 1991 in a swap deal that saw he and David Elliot exchange for Mark McWalter and George Shaw.

Charnley was an inconsistent performer with displays ranging from poor to outstanding and occasional outbursts of indiscipline and violence. At many points in his career, it seemed that top-flight football was beyond him. He was freed by Partick Thistle when the Glasgow club was in the Premier Division.

During his time at Thistle, he and two other players were approached by two teenage boys during a training session in a Glasgow Park. Despite suffering a stab wound to his hand when one of the boys brandished a Samurai sword, Charnley was able to disable his attacker with a punch.

Hibernian
He made his Hibernian debut in August 1997 against Celtic, where late on in the second half he latched on to a misplaced pass from fellow debutant Henrik Larsson and struck the winning goal from 25 yards. During his first few months at Hibs, many called for his inclusion in the Scotland squad, though this did not materialise. Despite a good start to the league campaign, Hibs' form soon faltered and they ended up being relegated at the end of the season.  By this stage Alex McLeish had already replaced Jim Duffy as manager at Hibernian, and had dropped Charnley from the side.

Back to Thistle

His final season as a player was with Partick Thistle in the 2002–03 Scottish Premier League season. Chic was approaching the age of 40, and made just two more appearances for Thistle after their promotion. His final match was perhaps fittingly against Hibernian at Easter Road. He came on as a substitute in a 3–2 victory for Thistle.

Coaching career
The next season (2003–04) he was appointed coach at Thistle under manager Gerry Collins, but when Collins was sacked by the Thistle board he resigned in protest at their decision.

Chic returned to Firhill during the 2006/2007 pre-season for ex-teammate Kenny Arthur's testimonial match versus a Celtic XI. With the game in injury time and Thistle losing 2–1, Chic rifled home a 25-yard strike to draw level. 
Charnley was appointed assistant manager of Clyde in February 2011 by Jim Duffy.

Honours 

 St Mirren
 Renfrewshire Cup: 1982–83

 Partick Thistle
Glasgow Cup: 1988–89

 Portadown
Irish Cup: 1998–99

References

External links
 

1963 births
Living people
Footballers from Glasgow
Scottish footballers
Scottish expatriate footballers
St Mirren F.C. players
Ayr United F.C. players
Clydebank F.C. (1965) players
Hamilton Academical F.C. players
Partick Thistle F.C. players
Bolton Wanderers F.C. players
Djurgårdens IF Fotboll players
Dumbarton F.C. players
Dundee F.C. players
Hibernian F.C. players
Portadown F.C. players
Kirkintilloch Rob Roy F.C. players
Rutherglen Glencairn F.C. players
Scottish Premier League players
Scottish Football League players
English Football League players
NIFL Premiership players
Scottish expatriate sportspeople in Ireland
Expatriate footballers in Sweden
Scottish expatriate sportspeople in Sweden
Cork City F.C. players
League of Ireland players
Clyde F.C. non-playing staff
Association football midfielders
Scottish Junior Football Association players
Expatriate association footballers in the Republic of Ireland
Ettan Fotboll players
People from Possilpark